NGC 3521 is a flocculent intermediate spiral galaxy located around 26 million light-years away from Earth in the constellation Leo. It has a morphological classification of SAB(rs)bc, which indicates that it is a spiral galaxy with a trace of a bar structure (SAB), a weak inner ring (rs), and moderate to loosely wound arm structure (bc). The bar structure is difficult to discern, both because it has a low ellipticity and the galaxy is at a high inclination of 72.7° to the line of sight. The relatively bright bulge is nearly 3/4 the size of the bar, which may indicate the former is quite massive. The nucleus of this galaxy is classified as an HII LINER, as there is an H II region at the core and the nucleus forms a low-ionization nuclear emission-line region.

References

External links

'Fluffy' Spiral Galaxy Shines in New Photo

Intermediate spiral galaxies
Flocculent spiral galaxies
Leo (constellation)
3521
Astronomical objects discovered in 1784
033550